Morena, de Morena or de la Morena is the surname of:

 Cris Morena, stage name of María Cristina De Giacomi (born 1956), Argentine television producer, actress, television presenter, composer, musician, songwriter, writer, former fashion model and CEO
 Éric Morena (1951–2019), French singer
 Erna Morena (1885–1962), German film actress
 Fabio Morena (born 1980), German footballer
 Fernando Morena (born 1952), Uruguayan retired footballer
 José Ramón de la Morena (born 1956), Spanish journalist
 Lolita Morena (born 1960), Swiss TV hostess
 N. de Morena, a 16th-century European ship pilot
 Ottone and Acerbo Morena, 12th century father and son Italian chroniclers

See also
 Moreno (surname)